Thomas Chafe MP JP DL (c. 1642–1701), West Hall, Folke, Dorset, was MP for Bridport from 1685 to 1688.

Background
Thomas Chafe was the eldest son of Thomas Chafe MP. He was educated at Sherborne, and Wadham College, Oxford.

Political career
He was a JP for Dorset from 1670 to 1700, commissioner for assessment 1673–80, Freeman of Lyme Regis in 1683, and DL of Dorset from 1685 to his death in 1701.

Family life
On 13 April 1662, Chafe married Susanna, the daughter and heiress of Edward Moleyns of West Hall. He had one son and five daughters. He died in 1701.

References

1640s births
1701 deaths
People educated at Sherborne School
Alumni of the University of Oxford
English MPs 1685–1687